R349 road may refer to:
 R349 road (Ireland)
 R349 road (South Africa)